Tailorbirds are small birds, most belonging to the genus Orthotomus. While they were often placed in the Old World warbler family Sylviidae, recent research suggests they more likely belong in the Cisticolidae and they are treated as such in Del Hoyo et al. 
One former species, the mountain tailorbird (and therefore also its sister species rufous-headed tailorbird), is actually closer to an old world warbler genus Cettia.

They occur in the Old World tropics, principally in Asia.

These warblers are usually brightly colored, with green or grey upper parts and yellow white or grey under parts. They often have chestnut on the head.

Tailorbirds have short rounded wings, short tails, strong legs and long curved bills. The tail is typically held upright, like a wren. They are typically found in open woodland, scrub and gardens.

Tailorbirds get their name from the way their nest is constructed. The edges of a large leaf are pierced and sewn together with plant fibre or spider's web to make a cradle in which the actual grass nest is built.

Species
The genus contains 13 species:
 Common tailorbird, Orthotomus sutorius
 Dark-necked tailorbird, Orthotomus atrogularis
 Cambodian tailorbird, Orthotomus chaktomuk
 Philippine tailorbird, Orthotomus castaneiceps
 Trilling tailorbird, Orthotomus chloronotus
 Rufous-fronted tailorbird, Orthotomus frontalis
 Grey-backed tailorbird, Orthotomus derbianus
 Rufous-tailed tailorbird, Orthotomus sericeus
 Ashy tailorbird, Orthotomus ruficeps
 Olive-backed tailorbird, Orthotomus sepium
 Yellow-breasted tailorbird, Orthotomus samarensis
 Black-headed tailorbird, Orthotomus nigriceps
 White-eared tailorbird, Orthotomus cinereiceps

Two species moved to the Cettiidae:
 Mountain tailorbird, Phyllergates cucullatus
 Rufous-headed tailorbird, Phyllergates heterolaemus

References

Bibliography
 The New Student's Reference Work/Tailor-Bird
 Baker, Kevin. Warblers of Europe, Asia and North Africa. (2007). 
 Ryan, Peter (2006). Family Cisticolidae (Cisticolas and allies). Pp. 378–492 in del Hoyo, J.; Elliott, A.; Christie, D.A. (editors). (2006). Handbook of the Birds of the World. Volume 11. Old World Flycatchers to Old World Warblers''. Lynx Edicions, Barcelona.

External links
Call of the common tailorbird

Cisticolidae